Saigusaia is a genus of flies belonging to the family Mycetophilidae.

The species of this genus are found in Europe and Northern America.

Species:
 Saigusaia aberrans Wu & Niu, 2008 
 Saigusaia cincta (Johannsen, 1912)

References

Mycetophilidae